Synaptojanin 2 is a protein that in humans is encoded by the SYNJ2 gene.

Function 

The gene is a member of the inositol-polyphosphate 5-phosphatase family. The encoded protein interacts with the ras-related C3 botulinum toxin substrate 1, which causes translocation of the encoded protein to the plasma membrane where it inhibits clathrin-mediated endocytosis. Alternative splicing results in multiple transcript variants. [provided by RefSeq, May 2010].

References

Further reading 

 
 
 
 
 
 
 
 
 

Genes
Human proteins